Ragavendra R. Baliga, FACC, FACP, FRCP (Edin) is a Professor of Medicine at The Ohio State University School of Medicine in Columbus, Ohio. He is a consulting editor of Heart Failure Clinics of North America, an indexed medical journal along with James B. Young, MD, Executive Dean, Lerner College of Medicine, Cleveland Clinic, Cleveland, Ohio. This is journal is known for editorials championing novel and esoteric mechanisms pertaining to cardiac function including ‘The Heart as the Concertina Pump’ and suggesting that stiffness of the great arteries contribute to cardiorenal syndrome. The most provocative editorial is a recent one that discusses the role of implantable cardiac defibrillators in sudden death. He is also Vice-Chief of the Division of Cardiovascular Medicine, at The Ohio State University of Medical Center.

Using pioneering positron emission tomography techniques at the MRC Cyclotron Center at Hammersmith Hospital, London along with Prof J.S. Kooner, Dr Stuart Rosen and Prof Paulo Camici, he demonstrated that angina occurring after a meal is due to "intramyocardial steal", wherein blood is redistributed from ischemic areas of the myocardium to the normally supplied myocardial in order to maintain overall myocardial blood flow. This mechanistic paper was published in the journal Circulation. Another paper published in the American Journal of Cardiology investigating the role of meal components showed that the carbohydrates contribute significantly to the pathogenesis of post-prandial angina. He also worked with Professor Christopher Mathias, FRCP, St. Mary’s Medical School and Imperial College of Science, Technology and Medicine and Prof Hans L. Frankel, FRCP, National Spinal Injuries Center, Stoke Mandeville Hospital, Ayelsbury.

While at Brigham and Women’s Hospital and Harvard Medical School he worked with Thomas Woodward Smith, MD, Chief of Cardiovascular Medicine and Professor of Medicine, Harvard Medical School and Ralph A Kelly, MD. At that time he worked as a part of a team to tease out the intracellular cell signaling pathways in response to a paracrine growth factor Neuregulin-1 in the cardiac myocyte. This research shed light on the effects of trastuzumab/Herceptin (a medication used in the treatment of breast cancer) on the heart and was published in the American Journal of Physiology and Journal of Biochemistry.

Baliga has written or edited a number of books but is best known for his book 250 Cases in Clinical Medicine, initially published by Balliere Tindall as 200 Cases in Clinical Medicine in June 1993, and later by W.B. Saunders, an imprint of Elsevier. He wrote this book at the age of 32. The book remains popular among medical students. His subsequent books include Self-assessment in Clinical Medicine, Saunders, although in its 3rd edition and 500 MCQs for the MRCP Part I, 1997 also by Saunders.  A more recent book, Practical Cardiology, co-edited with Kim A Eagle, MD, and published by Lippincott Wilkins, is more popular.

Early career 
Baliga received an MBBS, from St. John's Medical College, Bangalore in 1984 and post-doctoral degree Doctor of Medicine, from Bangalore Medical College/Bangalore University in 1988. In 1988 along with Prof Anura Kurpad, MD he was founding editor of St. John’s Journal of Medicine which was subsequently edited by Prof Ashley D’Cruz, MBBS, MS, MCH and Prof Sunitha Simon Kurpad, MD. After a hiatus this journal has been resurrected and now rechristened St. John’s Medical Journal.

He then migrated to the UK in 1988 and worked with Prof Hans Frankel, FRCP and Prof Christopher J Mathias, FRCP at the National Spinal Injuries Center affiliated with Stoke Mandeville Hospital, Aylesbury, Oxford Regional Health Authority and St. Mary’s Medical School, Paddington, London. The research he conducted shed light on the post-prandial cardiovascular hemodynamics in quadriplegics. Between 1990-1992 he worked at Clinical Tutor at University of Aberdeen, and Registrar with Prof James Petrie, FRCP who later on became President of Royal College of Physicians of Edinburgh, Prof Peter Brunt, FRCP, Prof John Webster, FRCP and Prof Nigel Benjamin, FRCP. From Scotland he moved the Hammersmith Hospital and Royal Postgraduate Medical School, London where he worked with Prof J.Kooner, FRCP and Prof Paolo Camici, FRCP at the MRC Cyclotron Center.  He was involved with research pertaining to premature coronary artery disease in those hailing from the Indian sub-continent and he also investigated post-prandial hemodynamics.

He subsequently migrated to the US to work at Harvard Medical School and Brigham and Women’s Hospital  where he was tutor on the New Pathway for Harvard medical students. He also worked with Prof Andrew Selwyn, FRCP, Professor of Harvard Medical School. His subsequent experience included working with Dr Wilson S. Colucci, Professor of Medicine and Chief of Cardiology at Boston University Medical Center and with Dr Clyde Yancy, MD and Dr Mark Drazner, MD at UT Southwestern Medical Center.

Notable research papers 
Mechanisms of Post-Prandial Angina Pectoris—Circulation, 1998;97:1144-49.
Neuregulin Cell Signaling in Cardiac Myocyte—Am J Physiol. 1999 Nov;277(5 Pt 2):H2026-37
Post-Prandial Hemodynamics in Quadriplegics—Clinical Autonomic Research, 1997;7:137-141.
Carbohydrates are more likely to cause post-prandial angina—Am J Cardiol, 1997;79:1397-1400

Books 

Baliga RR (ed). An Introductory Guide to Cardiac CT Imaging, Lippincott, Williams & Wilkins, 2010
Baliga RR. Statin Prescribing Guide (Oxford American Pocket Notes), Oxford University Press, 2010
Baliga, RR, Abraham WT (eds). Cardiac Resynchronization in Heart Failure, Lippincott, Williams & Wilkins, 2009
Eagle KA, Baliga RR (Eds). Practical Cardiology: Evaluation and Treatment of Common Cardiovascular Disorders, Lippincott, Williams & Wilkins, 2008, pp 688, 2nd edition
Raman J, Givertz M, Pitt B, Baliga RR (Eds).  Management of Heart Failure, (Springer Verlag), 2008.
Baliga RR, Neinber C, Isselbacher E, Eagle KA. Aortic Dissection and related syndromes. Springer, 2007
Baliga RR. Crash Course (US): Internal Medicine, Mosby, 2006
Baliga RR. Crash Course (US): Cardiology, Mosby, 2005 *
Baliga RR.  250 Cases in Clinical Medicine, Elsevier, 3rd edition, 2002.
Baliga RR. Self-assessment in Clinical Medicine, Saunders, 2003
Baliga RR. MCQs in Clinical Medicine, Saunders, 1999
Baliga RR. MCQs for the MRCP Part I, W.B. Saunders, 1997

Metaphrastic works 
Statin Prescribing Guide has been translated into Polish. Management of Heart Failure translated to Italian

Editorials 

 Baliga RR, Young JB. Editorial: Sudden death in heart failure: an ounce of prediction is worth a pound of prevention. Heart Fail Clin. 2011 Apr;7(2):xiii-xviii. .
 Baliga RR, Young JB. Editorial: depression in heart failure is double trouble: warding off the blues requires early screening. Heart Fail Clin. 2011 Jan;7(1):xiii-xvii. .
 Baliga RR, Young JB. Editorial: Giant strides and baby steps in pediatric cardiac disease and heart failure in children. Heart Fail Clin. 2010 Oct;6(4):xiii-v. .
 Baliga RR, Young JB. Staying in the pink of health for patients with cardiorenal anemia requires a multidisciplinary approach. Heart Fail Clin. 2010 Jul;6(3):xi-xvi. .
 Baliga RR, Young JB. Editorial. Unleashing our healthy avatars using cardiovascular genetics. Heart Fail Clin. 2010 Apr;6(2):xi-xiii. .
 Baliga RR, Young JB. Pharmacogenomics transforming medicine to create a world of immortal Struldbruggs or even a Methuselah? So be it! Heart Fail Clin. 2010 Jan;6(1):xi-xiii. .
 Baliga RR, Narula J. Salt never calls itself sweet. Indian J Med Res. 2009 May;129(5):472-7. .
 Baliga RR, Young JB. Editorial: Do biomarkers deserve high marks? Heart Fail Clin. 2009 Oct;5(4):ix-xii. .
 Baliga RR, Young JB. Using a magnet to strike gold. Heart Fail Clin. 2009 Jul;5(3):ix-x. .
 Baliga RR, Young JB. Editorial: Bench to bedside to home: homing-in on therapy that begins at home. Heart Fail Clin. 2009 Apr;5(2):xiii-xiv. .
 Baliga RR, Young JB. The race to tissue oxygenation: special teams GoGoGo. Heart Fail Clin. 2009 Jan;5(1):xi-xiv. .
 Baliga RR, Young JB. "Stiff central arteries" syndrome: does a weak heart really stiff the kidney? Heart Fail Clin. 2008 Oct;4(4):ix-xii. .
 Baliga RR, Young JB. Editorial: the concertina pump. Heart Fail Clin. 2008 Jul;4(3):xiii-xix. .
 Baliga RR, Young JB. Statins or status quo? Heart Fail Clin. 2008 Apr;4(2):ix-xii. .
 Baliga RR, Young JB. Energizing diastole. Heart Fail Clin. 2008 Jan;4(1):ix-xiii. Review. .
 Baliga RR, Young JB. Never too late to drink from the fountain of youth. Heart Fail Clin. 2007 Oct;3(4):xi-xii. .

Education

Honors and awards

Honoris Causa
Fellow of Royal College of Physicians, Edinburgh, 2002
Fellow of American College of Cardiology, 2002
Fellow, Royal Society of Medicine, London, 2007
 Representative and Visiting Professor of American College of Cardiology (ACC), 3rd Annual Best of ACC, Cardiovascular Medicine,Best Practices Series, India, 2009,  Hyderabad, New Delhi and Lucknow, Aug 1-7, 2009,
J.P. Das Oration, Indian College of Cardiology, 2010, Prof C.N. Manjunath,MD, DM, Dr U.C. Samal, Prof T.R. Raghu, MD, DM
Fellow of American College of Physicians, 2011
 Visiting Professor University of Naples Federico II, 2011, Facolta di Medicina e Chirugia, 17 giugno 2011, Aula grande edificio 2, introducono: Prof. Eduardo Bossone (AOU Salerno), Prof. Antonio Cittadini (Universita "Fedrico II" di Napoli)

References

External links
 https://web.archive.org/web/20111002094005/https://pro.osu.edu/profiles/baliga.3/

Year of birth missing (living people)
Living people
American cardiologists
Indian emigrants to the United States
Fellows of the Royal College of Physicians of Edinburgh
Ohio State University faculty
Indian cardiologists
Ross School of Business alumni
Bangalore University alumni
Fellows of the American College of Cardiology
Harvard Medical School people